Guido Barreyro (born 21 June 1988) is an Argentine football striker playing with Guaraní Antonio Franco.

Career
Born in Posadas, Misiones Department, Argentina, he played with Guaraní Antonio Franco in 2006.  That summer he moved to the Czech Republic and joined AC Sparta Prague but played only for the reserves team. In 2007, he returned to Argentina and played with Real Arroyo Seco. In 2008, he joined Newell's Old Boys but spent his time there on loan at San Martín de Tucumán where, however, due to bureaucratic problems with Sparta, he was unable to make an official appearance.  In 2009, he returned to his former club Guaraní, before returning to Europe in summer 2009 and joining Serbian First League side RFK Novi Sad. In following summer, Barreyro along his Novi Sad teammate Ecuatorian Augusto Batioja moved to FK Inđija who had just been promoted to the Serbian SuperLiga.  During the winter break of the 2010–11 season he was loaned to Swedish side FC Rosengård where he played during 2011.  In 2012, he returned to Argentina and after playing one year with Cruz del Sur de Bariloche, he joined in summer 2013 Defensores de Belgrano.

In January 2017, coming from Jorge Gibson, he signed with Atlético San Jorge from Santa Fe. With San Jorge he won the Copa de Santa Fe in March 2017. A year later, in January 2018, after a good season with San Jorge in Argentine Primera B Nacional, he moved on loan to Sweden to Kristianstad FC, a club San Jorge has a signed protocol with, along two other compatriots, Fernado Moreyra and Maximiliano Cabañas.

In summer 2019 he returned to Guaraní Antonio Franco.

References

External sources
 Interview at FUTBOL PERDIDO EN EL MUNDO. 

1988 births
Living people
People from Posadas, Misiones
Argentine footballers
Argentine expatriate footballers
Association football forwards
AC Sparta Prague players
Expatriate footballers in the Czech Republic
Newell's Old Boys footballers
San Martín de Tucumán footballers
RFK Novi Sad 1921 players
FK Inđija players
Serbian First League players
Serbian SuperLiga players
Argentine expatriate sportspeople in Serbia
Expatriate footballers in Serbia
Expatriate footballers in Sweden
FC Rosengård 1917 players
Sportspeople from Misiones Province